Ghaleh Rural District(Also:Qal'eh, Ghal'eh, Qaleh) is a rural district (dehestan) in the Zagros District of Chardavol County, Ilam Province, Iran. At the 2006 census, its population was 2,398, in 458 families.  It has 10 villages.

References 

Rural Districts of Ilam Province
Chardavol County